Kevin James O'Connor (born May 3, 1967) is an American lawyer who serves as vice president, General Counsel & Government Relations for the Carrier Corporation. Previously, he served as an attorney appointed by President George W. Bush and was unanimously confirmed by the United States Senate as Connecticut’s 48th United States Attorney in 2002. From January to April 2006, O'Connor served as an associate deputy attorney general. In 2007, O'Connor served as Chief of Staff to United States Attorney General Alberto R. Gonzales. In 2008, O'Connor was unanimously confirmed as Associate Attorney General of the United States, the number three position at the U.S. Department of Justice (DOJ), a post he held until 2009, when he left the DOJ to join the law firm of Bracewell and Giuliani.

Legal Education 
O’Connor graduated in 1992 with high honors from the University of Connecticut School of Law and with honors from the University of Notre Dame in 1989.

Legal career 

From 1992 to 1993, O'Connor served as a law clerk to the Honorable William H. Timbers of the United States Court of Appeals for the Second Circuit.

From 1993 to 1995, O'Connor was a litigation associate at the law firm of Cahill Gordon & Reindel in New York City.

From 1995 to 1997, O'Connor served as a Staff Attorney and Senior Counsel in the Division of Enforcement of the United States Securities & Exchange Commission in Washington, D.C.

Prior to his appointment as United States Attorney, O'Connor was a partner in the law firm of Day, Berry & Howard. While with Day, Berry & Howard, O'Connor also served from 1999 to 2001 as Corporation Counsel for the Town of West Hartford, Connecticut.

In 1998, O'Connor was the Republican nominee for the U.S. House of Representatives in Connecticut's heavily Democratic 1st district. He was defeated by John Larson 58% to 41%.

O'Connor served as an adjunct professor at the University of Connecticut School of Law through 2015. From 1996 to 1997, O’Connor served as adjunct professor at the National Law Center at George Washington University.

In 2015, O'Connor was appointed general counsel at Steven A. Cohen's Point72 Asset Management.

In late November 2019, O'Connor joined Carrier Corporation (formerly a division of United Technologies Corporation) as General Counsel.

References

External links

|-
 

University of Connecticut faculty
George Washington University faculty
University of Connecticut School of Law alumni
University of Notre Dame alumni
1967 births
Living people
United States Associate Attorneys General
United States Attorneys for the District of Connecticut
People associated with Cahill Gordon & Reindel